The 2008 São Paulo municipal election took place in the city of São Paulo, with the first round taking place on 1 October 2000 and the second round taking place on 29 October 2000. Voters voted to elect the mayor, the vice Mayor, and 55 City Councillors for the administration of the city. The Result was a 2nd round victory for Marta Suplicy of the Worker's Party (PT), winning 3,248,115 votes and a share of 58,51% of the popular vote, defeating Paulo Maluf of the Progressistas (PPB), who took 2,303,623 votes and a share of 41,49% of the popular vote.

Candidates

Candidates in runoff

Candidates failing to make runoff

Candidacy denied

Results

Mayor

City Councillors

References 

2000
October 2000 events in South America
2000 elections in Brazil